The Construction, Maintenance and Allied Workers Canada (CMAW) is a construction trade union headquartered in Vancouver. CMAW negotiates pay and work conditions on behalf of its 4,000 members in British Columbia and Alberta.  Union members include carpenters, shipbuilders, scaffolders, pipefitters, millwrights, lathers, cabinetmakers, display technicians, industrial workers and school board employees.

The union, which has nine local units in BC and two in Alberta, holds about 100 certifications, mostly in BC. It is affiliated with the independent Confederation of Canadian Unions.

History 

The Construction Maintenance and Allied Workers Canada (CMAW) was officially formed in 2007 following an 11-year struggle with their American-based International parent union – the United Brotherhood of Carpenters and Joiners of America (UBCJA). The newly formed union wanted direct democratic accountability from their leaders that was missing in the UBCJA and assurances that the elected leadership of (CMAW) were in fact working on behalf of the membership and not for themselves.

The BC Provincial Council of Carpenters Union (BCPCC) began in 1943 and represented workers of the carpentry trade. In its heyday, the union represented 17,000 members but the recession of the early 1980s, as well as a corporate attack that resulted in government changes to the Labour code reduced this number considerably

From the very beginning, this group of Canadian workers resented being a part of an American union. They were unable to see how a U.S. union could effectively represent workers in Canada. Workers in British Columbia perceived the UBCJA, located in Washington, D.C., as a group of union leaders who would cross the border from time-to-time, but who ultimately were unaware of worker concerns and issues in Canada.

During the effort to break away from their American parent union, BCPCC entered into an affiliation agreement with a new parent union – Communications, Energy and Paperworkers Union of Canada (CEP) Local 470 – one of Canada's largest unions, which has headquarters in Ottawa and represents 150,000 workers across from work sectors including the oil-and-gas and chemical mining industries, pulp-and-paper mills, newspapers and telephone companies.

The two bodies created the Construction Maintenance and Allied Workers Bargaining Council (CMAW), and this union then developed a construction arm to accommodate the specific needs of this new group of members.

With a parent union in place, CMAW then went on to re-sign their members over from their previous BCPCC locals to CMAW locals while continuing their fight to leave the UBCJA. With the assistance of mediation, provided by the Labour relations board of BC (BCLRB) terms of settlement were finally established giving CMAW the green light to finalize their separation from UBCJA.

In 2008 CMAW made union history by becoming the first official all-Canadian multi trade union organized along the same lines as the AFL-CIO building trade unions.

In 2012 CMAW ended its affiliation with the Communications, Energy and Paperworkers Union of Canada by mutual agreement.

Present 

CMAW now represents approximately 4,000 active members – 95 per cent of whom are construction workers and the rest are school board workers, manufacturing shop workers, and shipbuilders.

Knowing that only 20 per cent of construction workers are unionized, CMAW continues to make progress in their organizing efforts.

Carpenters and other Trades who are represented by CMAW currently earn more than $35 an hour and enjoy a competitive pension and benefits plan.

CMAW organized employers have constructed or are constructing major projects in Western Canada such as the Waneta Dam, The John Hart Dam, Site C dam, Alcan Aluminium Smelter, CNRL Horizon major projects, Mosaic Potash and the 8 billion dollar National Ship Building Procurement NSPS.

CMAW also supplies tradespeople for routine plant maintenance, turnarounds and shutdowns across western Canada.

The union is a member of the Confederation of Canadian Unions as of September 2013.

Organization 

CMAW comprises nine locals in BC and Alberta and is governed by a 17-person executive board of member directly elected representatives.

The executive board is elected by delegates at CMAW's biennial convention and board members currently serve a four-year term.

CMAW's president and secretary-treasurer, also elected positions, are full-time council employees. The President is Chris Wasilenchuck; the Secretary-Treasurer: Paul Nedelec Jr.

Its official publication is The Write Angle, a member publication mailed quarterly.

References

External links 

Site C news release Government of BC
Seaspan wins second Federal contract
BCLRB clears way for CMAW
CMAW contractor ATCO completes camp on time and on budget
CMAW union established after vote

Trade unions in Canada
Building and construction trade unions
Trade unions established in 2007
2007 establishments in British Columbia
Confederation of Canadian Unions